Brothers Grim is a Russian pop-rock group. Created by twins Boris and  Konstantin Burdaevs  in 1998.

Awards 
 2005:  Golden Gramophone
 2005:  Song of the Year
  2007: Popov Award
  2007: Radio Maximum Award
  2013: Lira

Studio albums
 The Brothers Grim (2005)
 Illusion (Иллюзия; 2006)
Spring Tales of the Brothers Grim (Весенние сказки братьев Грим; 2006)
 The Martians (Марсиане; 2007)
 Titan Wings (Крылья Титана; 2010)
Favorite Music (Любимая музыка; 2015)
Zombie (Zoмби; 2015)
 Robinson (Робинзон; 2019)

References

External links

Official website 
 

Musical groups established in 1998
Russian rock music groups
1998 establishments in Russia
Family musical groups
Sibling musical groups
Winners of the Golden Gramophone Award
Russian pop rock music groups